The Dominican Republic competed in the Summer Olympic Games for the first time at the 1964 Summer Olympics in Tokyo, Japan.

Athletics
Men
 cono esto maldito

References
Official Olympic Reports

Nations at the 1964 Summer Olympics
1964
1964 in Dominican Republic sport